Plecto is a business performance platform designed to help businesses get an overview of their performance metrics and improve their strategic decision-making. With Plecto, companies can track and visualize their key performance indicators (KPIs) on dashboards that update automatically and in real time. Plecto offers dashboard, reporting, gamification, and coaching solutions. The company was founded in 2012 in Aarhus, Denmark and operates worldwide.

Plecto is a software tool for companies that aim to increase performance through positive motivation and engagement while introducing gamification and coaching as part of the growth process.

Product 
Plecto offers highly customizable real-time dashboards and reports, and helps organizations to build insightful KPI dashboards that visualize data across business systems. Organizations can import data from their current systems and filter the data across multiple sources to create in-depth performance dashboards that take more variables into account.

Plecto integrates with more than 100 different systems and databases, including Salesforce, Aircall, Dixa, Zapier, Asana, Jira, Google Sheets, MySQL, Oracle, and many more.

With its gamification features, Plecto aims at engaging teams with leaderboards, achievements, and notifications. It integrates with Philips Hue lighting and Sonos wireless speakers for visual recognition of accomplishments. Users are able to access and display their individual or team's dashboards from their desktop, tablet, TV, and from the smartphone app.

History 
Plecto was founded by Kristian Houlberg Øllegaard and Steffen Bagge in 2012.

At the time, Kristian Houlberg Øllegaard was employed in a retention department in a local call center. Frustrated by having to manually keep track of sales and retentions, he decided to develop a software that could automate this process. They implemented the software across the department and put up large TV screens across the office to display the dashboards. The result was an almost instant increase in the retention rate to a record-setting 74.6%.

Shortly after that, Kristian Øllegaard decided to leave his formal studies at the university and instead dedicate his time to Plecto.

Funding 
In 2014, investor and founder of Just-Eat, Jesper Buch, entered the company providing the first round of funding. Two years later, in January 2016, the company was granted a loan from the Danish Growth Fund to implement their plans for growth. Other investors include Jan Dal Lehrmann, co-founder of BilBasen, and CEO of Benjamin Media, who in 2017 invested in Plecto to further new expansion.

Markets 
As of March 2017, Plecto serves customers in 30 countries across the world.

External links 
 Official website
 List of integrations
 Sign up for a 14-day free trial

References 

Online companies of Denmark
Danish companies established in 2012
Companies based in Aarhus
Software companies established in 2012
Privately held companies of Denmark